TravelMuse is an online travel planning website. TravelMuse claims booking is just the last 5% of the process.

History 

TravelMuse (formerly known as TripOvation) was founded in May 2007 by Kevin Fliess and Eric Wood. The company has raised more than $3.5 million in funding from Azure Capital Partners and California Technology Ventures. TravelMuse is headquartered in Los Altos, California.

References

External links 
 TravelMuse website

American travel websites
Companies based in Santa Clara County, California
Los Altos, California